
This is a list of the 27 players who earned 2019 European Tour cards through Q School in 2018.

 2019 European Tour rookie
 First-time member ineligible for Rookie of the Year award

2019 Results

* European Tour rookie in 2019
† First-time member ineligible for Rookie of the Year award
T = Tied 
 The player retained his European Tour card for 2020 (finished inside the top 115).
 The player did not retain his European Tour card for 2020, but retained conditional status (finished between 116 and 155, inclusive).
 The player did not retain his European Tour card for 2020 (finished outside the top 155).

Winners on the European Tour in 2019

Runners-up on the European Tour in 2019

See also
2018 Challenge Tour graduates
2019 European Tour

References

External links
Official website

European Tour
European Tour Qualifying School Graduates
European Tour Qualifying School Graduates